The Rentekammeret (English: The Treasury) was the Danish central administrative body responsible for overseeing the public finances from the middle of the 15th century until 1849. The chief officials of Rentekammeret held the title of Rentemester (Treasurer).

History
The Rentekammer, is first mentioned in the 1550sm althoug a rentemester is mentioned as early as 1517. At the introduction of the absolute monarchy in 1660 it became a kollegium under the name Skatkammerkollegiet, but in 1679 it was given its old name back.

In 1770 it was merged with the General Customs Chamber (Generaltoldkammeret) and in 1771 became part of the Finanskollegiet, but was revived in 1773 as an independent bodu under its old name. Originally, the Rentekammeret was solely in charge of the state's payments and disbursements as well as accounting audits, but eventually also became responsible for the overall financial and tax policy as well as for agricultural matters, forestry, roads etc. Over the years, however, changes were made on several occasions in the division of responsibilities between the Rentekammeret and other central administrative bodies. In the ministerial reform of 1848, its affairs were divided between the Ministry of Finance and the Ministry of Interior Affairs.

List of Treasurers
People with title of Rentemester:

See also
 Marshal of the Realm (Denmark)
 Steward of the Realm (Denmark)

References

External links
 Biographies of Rentemester fooice holders

Government of Denmark

da:Rentekammeret